Mihkel Pärnoja (born 3 January 1946 Vändra) is an Estonian chemist and politician. He was a member of VII Riigikogu.

References

Living people
1946 births
Estonian chemists
Members of the Riigikogu, 1992–1995
Members of the Riigikogu, 1995–1999
Members of the Riigikogu, 1999–2003
University of Tartu alumni
Academic staff of the University of Tartu
Recipients of the Order of the National Coat of Arms, 5th Class
People from Vändra